Homewood is a station on the East Busway, located in Homewood and near the Point Breeze neighborhoods of Pittsburgh.

References

Bus stations in Pennsylvania
Port Authority of Allegheny County stations
Martin Luther King Jr. East Busway